Community boards of Queens  are New York City community boards in the borough of Queens, which are the appointed advisory groups of the community districts that advise on land use and zoning, participate in the city budget process, and address service delivery in their district.

Community boards are each composed of up to 50 volunteer members appointed by the local borough president, half from nominations by City Council members representing the community district (i.e., whose council districts cover part of the community district). Additionally, all City Council members representing the community district are non-voting, ex officio board members.

History 
The 1963 revision of the New York City Charter extended the Borough of Manhattan's "Community Planning Councils" (est. 1951) to the outer boroughs as "Community Planning Boards", which are now known as "Community Boards".

The 1975 revision of the New York City Charter set the number of Community Districts/Boards to 59, established the position of the district manager for the community districts, and created the Uniform Land Use Review Procedure (ULURP) which gave the community boards the authority to review land use proposals such as zoning actions, and special permits.

Community boards 

The 14 community boards in Queens, and a few representative neighborhoods in each, are listed below:

Queens Community Board 1 : Astoria, Long Island City, Rikers Island
Queens Community Board 2 : Sunnyside, Woodside
Queens Community Board 3 : Jackson Heights, East Elmhurst, North Corona
Queens Community Board 4 : Elmhurst, Corona
Queens Community Board 5 : Maspeth, Middle Village, Ridgewood, Glendale
Queens Community Board 6 : Rego Park, Forest Hills
Queens Community Board 7 : Flushing, Whitestone, College Point
Queens Community Board 8 : Fresh Meadows, Kew Gardens Hills, Jamaica Hills
Queens Community Board 9 : Woodhaven, Richmond Hill, Ozone Park,  Kew Gardens
Queens Community Board 10 : Howard Beach, South Ozone Park, Ozone Park,
Queens Community Board 11 : Bayside, Douglaston, Little Neck, Auburndale
Queens Community Board 12 : Jamaica, South Jamaica, Hollis, St. Albans
Queens Community Board 13 : Laurelton, Cambria Heights, Queens Village, Glen Oaks
Queens Community Board 14 : The Rockaways, Broad Channel

Other areas 
Within the borough of Queens there are five Joint Interest Areas (JIA), which are outside of the jurisdiction of individual community districts, and have their own district number. The five JIAs in Queens county are:
 District 80 - LaGuardia Airport, 2010 Census population: Zero
 District 81 - Flushing Meadows-Corona Park, 2010 Census population: 56
 District 82 - Forest Park, 2010 Census population: 691
 District 83 - JFK International Airport, 2010 Census population: Zero
 District 84 - Queens Gateway National Recreation Area, 2010 Census population: 45

Rikers Island, while legally a part of The Bronx, is represented by Queens Community Board 1.

The Queens Borough Board 

The Queens Borough Board is composed of the borough president, New York City Council members whose districts are part of the borough, and the chairperson of each community board in Queens.
The current borough board is composed of the 30 members listed in the table below:

Notable members 
 Adrienne Adams (Queens CB12)
 Tony Avella (Queens CB7)
 Edward Braunstein (Queens CB11)
 Robert Holden (Queens CB5)
 Bill Kresse (Queens CB3)
 Peter Koo (Queens CB7)
 Michael G. Miller (Queens CB4)
 Jessica Ramos (Queens CB3)
 Claire Shulman
 Julie Won (Queens CB22)

See also 
Government of New York City
List of Queens neighborhoods
New York City Council
Borough president
Borough boards of New York City

References

External links 
 Queens Community Boards
 BoardStat from BetaNYC

 
Queens, New York
Government of New York City
Urban planning in New York City